The Conway Hotel is a historic hotel building at 108 Courthouse Square in Murfreesboro, Arkansas.  Built in 1913, it was the first brick hotel building in the rural town; it was built in response to an influx of diamond miners into the area after the Crater of Diamonds was discovered.  It is a two-story structure with modest Craftsman styling.

The building was listed on the National Register of Historic Places in 1986.

See also
National Register of Historic Places listings in Pike County, Arkansas

References

Hotel buildings on the National Register of Historic Places in Arkansas
Hotel buildings completed in 1913
1913 establishments in Arkansas
National Register of Historic Places in Pike County, Arkansas
American Craftsman architecture in Arkansas